The Maryland Department of General Services is a Government of Maryland agency that manages, operates, and maintains multi-agency state facilities in the State of Maryland. As of 2023, the department was headed by Atif Chaudhry. It is the parent organization of the Maryland Capitol Police.

References

External links 
 Maryland Department of General Services

General Services